Morrissette may refer to:
Brian Morrissette (born 1956), United States Virgin Islands athlete
Gabriel Morrissette (born 1959), Canadian illustrator

See also
Morissette (disambiguation)
Morisset (disambiguation)
Chateau Morrisette Winery, a winery in Virginia, United States